The Jahan-Nama Tower (Translit World view tower Persian:برج جهان نما) is a building built by Municipality of Isfahan in Imam Hosein Square, Isfahan. Some floors were destroyed because of ruining historic view(visual conflict) from Naghshe Jahan Square. It was first built in 1996  by demolishing historic caravansarai "Tahdid" (an Iranian Registered National Heritage). Early it was meant to be 50 meters height, but it was reduced by UNESCO intervention. Iranian President Mohammad Khatami wrote a letter to minister of cultural heritage and tourism .I have spoken with UNESCO chief, UNESCO will end the case if only this tower is reduced.

Two floors were destroyed from the top. in 1384(2006).

References 

Buildings and structures in Isfahan